Konar Kheymeh (also Romanized as Konār Kheymeh and Kenar Kheimeh; also known as Kinār Khema and Kohneh Kheymeh) is a village in Nayband Rural District, Chah-e Mobarak District, Asaluyeh County, Bushehr Province, Iran. At the 2006 census, its population was 376, in 49 families.

References 

Populated places in Asaluyeh County